
Ryki County is a unit of territorial administration and local government (powiat) in Lublin Voivodeship, eastern Poland. It was established on January 1, 1999, as a result of the Polish local government reforms passed in 1998.

As of 2019, its total population is 59,919, including a population of 16,026 in Dęblin, 9,625 in Ryki, and a rural population of 30,268.

Neighbouring counties
Ryki County is bordered by Łuków County to the north-east, Lubartów County to the east, Puławy County to the south, Kozienice County to the west and Garwolin County to the north-west.

Administrative division
The county is subdivided into six gminas (one urban, one urban-rural and four rural). These are listed in the following table, in descending order of population.

References

 
Ryki